Vito de Luca, better known as Aeroplane, is a Belgian nu disco music producer and DJ.

Known for incorporating a mix of French house and balearic beat, Aeroplane made a name for himself as a club DJ. Aeroplane's music is disco-styled, often on the 1980s decade. Aeroplane's remixes are described by themselves as "spacious cosmic disco" tracks.

Formerly Aeroplane was a duo, consisting of Vito de Luca and Stephen Fasano (currently known as The Magician), who left in 2010.

Biography
Aeroplane's music has been picked up by many world DJs which gained them popularity.

Pete Tong, a famous radio DJ and music producer, working as a DJ on BBC Radio 1 station in United Kingdom has been one of the many to pick up their music. The interest has been wide, as Aeroplane have been chosen as the 500th Essential Mixer on the eclectic music show called Essential Mix broadcast by different DJs on BBC Radio 1 on Fridays between 1am and 3am. Aeroplane have been selected for this occasion by Pete Tong and a board of people to do with music and events. They have played a full hour of tracks upcoming on their album in the first hour of the anniversary show on 24 April 2010, where the show lasted for 4 hours instead of normal 2 hours, between 1am and 5am. For the following three hours, as a celebration of the 500th Mixer to appear on Essential Mix show, Pete Tong, Sasha and Richie Hawtin played their sets.

Aeroplane released debut album entitled We Can't Fly in September 2010, after 12 months of studio work. The album consists of pop songs written and performed by Vito de Luca, along with guests vocals from the likes of Au Revoir Simone, Merry Clayton, Sky Ferreira, Nicolas Kerr (Poni Hoax) and Jonathan Jeremiah. It received a positive review of 8 from SPIN magazine.

Discography

Studio albums

Compilations

Extended plays

Singles

Collaborations

Remixes

Music videos

References

External links
Aeroplane's Official Website

Belgian dance musicians
Nu-disco musicians
Remixers